The 1945 Wisconsin Badgers football team was an American football team that represented the University of Wisconsin in the 1945 Big Ten Conference football season. The team compiled a 3–4–2 record (2–3–1 against conference opponents) and finished in sixth place in the Big Ten Conference. Harry Stuhldreher was in his 10th year as Wisconsin's head coach. The team led the Big Ten with an average of 310 yards of total offense per game.

Don Kindt tied for the lead in the Big Ten with 36 points scored, and Rex Johns led the conference with an average of 40.8 yards per punt. Tackle Clarence Esser received the team's most valuable player award. Esser also received first-team honors from the Associated Press on the 1945 All-Big Ten Conference football team. Jack Mead was the team captain.

The team played its home games at Camp Randall Stadium. During the 1945 season, the average attendance at home games was 32,666.

Schedule

References

Wisconsin
Wisconsin Badgers football seasons
Wisconsin Badgers football